Robert Natkin (November 7, 1930 – April 20, 2010) was an American abstract painter whose work is associated with abstract expressionism, color field painting, and Lyrical Abstraction.

He was born in Chicago, and from the early 1950s he created paintings which are represented in the permanent collections of major museums as well as in corporate and private collections. His work has been exhibited in leading galleries in the U.S., Europe and Japan.  His work was written about extensively by critic Peter Fuller.

He lived with his wife, painter Judith Dolnick, in Connecticut. Natkin enjoyed painting as well as singing gospel according to the Akron Art Institute, Akron, Ohio.

Selected collections
 The Albright-Knox Art Gallery, Buffalo, New York
 The Art Institute of Chicago, Chicago, Illinois
 The Boca Raton Museum of Art, Boca Raton, Florida
 The Brooklyn Museum of Art, New York City
 The Butler Institute of American Art, Youngstown, Ohio
 Centre Pompidou, Paris, France
 The Columbus Museum of Art, Columbus, Ohio
 Fogg Art Museum, Harvard University Art Museums, Cambridge, Massachusetts
 The Hirshhorn Museum and Sculpture Garden, Smithsonian Institution, Washington, DC
 Krannert Art Museum, University of Illinois, Champaign-Urbana, Illinois
 Los Angeles County Museum of Art, Los Angeles, California
 The Metropolitan Museum of Art, New York
 The Mint Museum of Art, Charlotte, North Carolina
 Pennsylvania State University, University Park
 Rhode Island School of Design, Providence, Rhode Island
 Carnegie Institute, Pittsburgh
 The Museum of Fine Arts, Houston
 The Museum of Modern Art, New York City
 National Gallery of Australia, Canberra, Australia
 New Britain Museum of American Art, New Britain, Connecticut
 Oklahoma Art Center, Oklahoma City
 San Diego Museum of Art, San Diego
 The Solomon R. Guggenheim Museum, New York
 Wadsworth Atheneum, Hartford, Connecticut
 Whitney Museum of American Art, New York
 Worcester Art Museum, Worcester, Massachusetts

See also
Wells Street Gallery

References

Fuller, Peter.  (1980).  Art and psychoanalysis.  London:  Writers and Readers Publishing Cooperative.

External links
 
 New York Times Obituary
 Obituary in The Independent by Marcus Williamson

20th-century American painters
American male painters
21st-century American painters
21st-century American male artists
1930 births
2010 deaths
Artists from Chicago
20th-century American male artists